Bethesda-by-the-Sea is an Episcopal Church by the Lake Worth Lagoon in Palm Beach, Florida. It is part of the Episcopal Diocese of Southeast Florida and the oldest existing congregation in Palm Beach. The church building is an example of the gothic revival style and surrounds a courtyard.

History
Initially the church began in the Little Red Schoolhouse in January 1889. The initial church was built of mostly wood from lumber from the beach with service beginning in April that year. There was little access to the church aside from by boat. A larger new lot was sought in the following years with a rectory being built in 1890 and a second church built in the spring of 1895. The second church held its last service on Easter Sunday April 12, 1925.
 The church held the first service at its current location on Christmas Day 1926.
Donald and Melania Trump were married in the church on January 22, 2005. Trump's youngest son, Barron, was christened at the church. They have attended Christmas Eve and Easter Celebrations here in 2016, 2017, and 2019 after Trump's election as President of the United States.

Michael Jordan and Yvette Prieto were married at the church on April 27, 2013.

References

External links
   Official Site

Churches in Palm Beach County, Florida
Episcopal church buildings in Florida
Gothic Revival church buildings in Florida
1889 establishments in Florida
Churches completed in 1926